Peter the Great: His Life and World is a 1980 text written by Robert K. Massie. The book won the 1981 Pulitzer Prize for Biography or Autobiography. The book chronicles the life of Peter I of Russia, and is divided into five parts: "Old Muscovy", "The Great Embassy", "The Great Northern War", "On the European Stage", and "The New Russia".

It was adapted in a 1986 TV miniseries.

Reception

Reviewing the book in the American Historical Review, James Cracraft criticized it for overlooking the main scholarly studies in English, while relying heavily on an 1884 British biography. Cracraft, while stating that he cannot recommend the book to scholars, concluded:

References

Pulitzer Prize for Biography or Autobiography-winning works
1981 non-fiction books
Russian biographies
Cultural depictions of Peter the Great
Ballantine Books books